Tourism in Belize has grown considerably recently, and it is now the second largest industry in the nation. Belizean Prime Minister Dean Barrow has stated his intention to use tourism to combat poverty throughout the country. The growth in tourism has positively affected the agricultural, commercial, and finance industries, as well as the construction industry. The results for Belize's tourism-driven economy have been significant, with the nation welcoming almost one million tourists in a calendar year for the first time in its history in 2012.

History
Prior to its independence in 1981, Belize was not regarded as a place to travel due to lack of infrastructure to cater to large-scale tourism. However, rapid expansion of the tourist industry over the last decade has made it the nation's second largest industry.

Tourism:
Belize has large array of diverse tourists, adventure tourists and eco-tourist attractions.  The Belize Barrier Reef (second largest in the world), over 450 offshore Cayes (islands), excellent fishing, safe waters for windsurfing, swimming, cave rafting, boating, paddleboarding, scuba diving, and snorkelling, numerous rivers for rafting, and kayaking, various jungle and wildlife reserves of fauna and flora, for hiking, bird watching, and helicopter touring, as well as many Maya ruins—support the thriving tourism and ecotourism industry. Of the hundreds of cave systems, Belize also holds the largest cave system in Central America, 544 species of birds, and well-preserved natural beauty. Despite all this, it is still among the least visited countries in the region.

Development costs are high, but the Government of Belize has designated tourism as its second development priority after agriculture. In 2012, tourist arrivals totalled 917,869 (with about 584,683 from the U.S.) and tourist receipts amounted to over $1.3 billion.

Tourism is the domain of the Ministry of Tourism, within which the Belize Tourism Board works as a link between the private and public sector.

The tourism industry is an important part of the economy of Belize, in 2007 contributing to over 25% of all jobs, and making up over 18% of the GDP. This constituted 590 million BZD (295 million USD), according to the Belize government, up 90 million BZD (45 million USD) from the year before.  Important tourist attractions in Belize include the natural attractions of land and sea, making the areas important in Ecotourism, as well as the historic ruins of Belize's Pre-Columbian Maya civilization.

Popular tourist destinations include San Pedro Town and Caye Caulker, both located about 70 km and 40 km east off the coast of Belize, both situation only a few miles from the Barrier Reef at any point. They have been regarded as a "tropical paradises" by the Los Angeles Times. Cruise ships have been docking in Belize City, and average 850,000 tourists alone every year, some who partake in tours to nearby districts as well as the colonial city.

Mainland beaches
 Almond Beach, Hopkins
 Maya Beach, Placencia
 Sabal Beach, Punta Negra
 Sarteneja
 Orchid Bay, Corozal
 Monkey River Beach
 Cerros Beach (A mini Tulum)
 Cucumber Beach, Mile 4, Western Highway
 Gales Point Lagoon
 Honey Camp Lagoon

Popular cayes

 San Pedro Town, Ambergris Caye 
 Caye Caulker
 Coco Plum Island
 Half Moon Caye
 Laughing Bird Caye
 Goff's Caye
 St. George's Caye
 Tobacco Caye
 Blackadore Caye
 Caye Chapel
 Sapodilla Cayes

Rural and community-based tourism
Many privately run companies have cooperatives in Southern Belize that manage a rural and community-based tourism project, which has been developed with support from the UNESCO. Tourism allows otherwise marginalized minorities such as the Maya and the Garifuna people to receive new opportunities in alternative markets, harvest crops, preserve and involve foreigners in their culture and diversify their income. Many companies offer visitors the opportunity to visit a cacao, cashew farm, learn about Maya, Kriol or Garifuna craftsmanship, and even to stay overnight on a Maya, Kriol or Garifuna village and explore with a community guide.

Ecological tourism

Eco-tourism aims to be ecologically and socially conscious, it focuses on local culture, wilderness, and adventure. Belize's eco-tourism is growing with every passing year, it boasts a number of eco-tourist tours and energy efficient hotels, with environmentally-conscious and renewable resources. Popular eco-tourism destinations in Belize include the Cockscomb Basin Wildlife Sanctuary, Mountain Pine Ridge Forest Reserve, Swallow Caye Wildlife Sanctuary, and the Community Baboon Sanctuary.

Waterfalls
Antelope Falls in Mayflower Bocawina National Park
Mayflower Bocawina Falls in Mayflower Bocawina National Park
Big Rock Falls in the Mountain Pine Ridge Forest Reserve of the Cayo District
Butterfly Falls in the Mountain Pine Ridge Forest Reserve of the Cayo District
Five Sisters Falls in the Mountain Pine Ridge Forest Reserve of the Cayo District
Rio Blanco Falls
Rio On Pools
San Antonio Falls
Thousand Foot Falls  in the Mountain Pine Ridge Forest Reserve of the Cayo District

Archaeological reserves

Before the arrival of Europeans in America, Belize lay in the heartland of the Maya civilisation, and consequently contains some of the earliest and most important Maya ruins. Archaeological findings at Caracol, in the southern end of the country, have suggested that it formed the centre of political struggles in the southern Maya lowlands. The complex covered an area much larger than present-day Belize City and supported more than twice the modern city's population. Meanwhile, Lamanai, in the north, is known for being the longest continually-occupied site in Mesoamerica, settled during the early Preclassic era and continuously occupied up to and during the area's colonisation.

While the majority of reserves under this category are related to the pre-colonial era, Serpon Sugar Mill and Yarborough Cemetery, both designated in 2009, only date from the 19th century and are alternatively described as historical reserves.

The country's 15 archaeological sites are managed by the Institute of Archaeology, a branch of the National Institute of Culture and History (NICH), which comes under the authority of the Ministry of Tourism, Civil Aviation and Culture. This type of protected area was gazetted under the Ancient Monuments and Antiquities Act, 1 May 1972. All of the following reserves are open to the public. Many other sites, such as Cuello and Uxbenka, are located on private land and can only be visited if prior permission is obtained from the landowner.

List of Maya ruins in Belize

The following is a list of other archaeological sites located within Belize:
 Actun Tunichil Muknal
 Altun Ha
 Baking Pot
 Barton Creek Cave
 Cahal Pech
 Caracol
 Cerros
 Chaa Creek
 Colha
 Cuello
 El Pilar
 Ka'Kabish
 K'axob
 La Milpa

 Lamanai
 Louisville
 Lubaantun
 Marco Gonzalez
 Nim Li Punit
 Nohmul
 Nohoch Che'en
 Pusilha
 San Estevan
 Santa Rita, Corozal
 Serpon sugar mill
 Tipu
 Uxbenka
 Xnaheb
 Xunantunich

Main natural attractions
Roughly 26% (2.6 million acres, or 1.22 million hectares) of Belizean land and sea is preserved within a total of 95 reserves, which vary in their purpose and level of protection. This network of protected areas exists under a variety of management structures:

National parks

In Belize, national parks are areas designed for the protection and preservation of natural and aesthetic features of national significance for the benefit and enjoyment of the people. Therefore, they are areas of recreation and tourism, as well as environmental protection. National parks are gazetted under the National Parks System Act of 1981. They are administered by the Forest Department and managed through partnership agreements with community-based non-governmental organisations.

Natural monuments

A natural monument is designated for the preservation of unique geographic features of the landscape. The designation is primarily based on a feature's high scenic value, but may also be regarded as a cultural landmark that represents or contributes to a national identity.

Natural monuments are gazetted under the National Parks System Act of 1981; marine-based monuments additionally come under the Fisheries Act. Of the five natural monuments in the country, three are terrestrial, administered by the Forest Department, while the remaining two are marine-based and come under the authority of the Fisheries Department.

Nature reserves

The country's three nature reserves enjoy the highest level of protection within the national protected areas system. The designation was created for the strict protection of biological communities or ecosystems, and the maintenance of natural processes in an undisturbed state. They are typically pristine, wilderness ecosystems.

Nature reserves are legislated under the National Parks System Act of 1981. It is the strictest designation of all categories within the country's national protected areas system, with no extractive use or tourism access permitted. Permits are required to enter the area and are restricted to researchers only. The nature reserves are under the authority of the Forest Department.

The oldest of these, Bladen Nature Reserve, forms the centrepiece of the Maya Mountains biological corridor, and is considered one of the most biodiversity-rich, and topographically unique areas within the Mesoamerican biodiversity hotspot.

Wildlife sanctuaries
Wildlife sanctuaries are created for the preservation of an important keystone species in the ecosystem. By preserving enough area for them to live in, many other species receive the protection they need as well.

Wildlife sanctuaries are gazetted under the National Parks System Act of 1981, and are the responsibility of the Forest Department. There are currently seven wildlife sanctuaries, three of which are being managed under co-management partnerships, whilst the other four are managed under informal arrangements. Two of the following wildlife sanctuaries are considered to be marine protected areas, and may also have collaborative agreements with the Fisheries Department in place.

Forest reserves

Forest reserves, overseen by the Forest Department, are designed for the sustainable extraction of timber without destroying the biodiversity of the location. These are gazetted under the Forests Act of 1927, which allows the department to grant permits to logging companies after extensive review.

Marine reserves

Marine reserves are designed for the conservation of aquatic ecosystems, including marine wildlife and its environment. The majority of these reserves contribute to the conservation of Belize's Barrier Reef, which provides a protective shelter for pristine atolls, seagrass meadows and rich marine life. The preservation of the Barrier Reef system has been recognised as a global interest through the collective designation of seven protected areas, including four of the following marine reserves, as a World Heritage Site.

Marine reserves are legislated under the Fisheries Act, and are administered by the Fisheries Department. One of the department's key responsibilities is to ensure the sustainable extraction of marine resources. There are currently eight marine reserves, management of which is either direct, by the department, or in partnership with non-governmental agencies.

Gallery

Attractions by district

Belize District
Altun Ha
Great Blue Hole
La Isla Bonita Ambergris Caye
Belize Barrier Reef
Hol Chan Marine Reserve
Museum of Belize
Fort Street Tourism Village
The Bliss Institute for the Performing Arts
Old Belize Museum and Cucumber Beach
The Belize Zoo (Called, "The Best little zoo in the world")
Caye Caulker
Belikin beer brewery
San Pedro Town
Swing Bridge
Bakabush Adventure Tours
Crocland Eco-park
Numerous Cayes (islands)
Gales Point
Bacab Eco Park

Stann Creek District
Cockscomb Basin Wildlife Sanctuary and Jaguar Reserve
Placencia
Hopkins
Victoria Peak
Tobacco Caye
Dangriga
Numerous Cayes

Orange Walk District
Lamanai
San Estevan (Maya site)
Rio Bravo Conservation and Management Area

Cayo District
Actun Tunichil Muknal
Caracol
Xunantunich
Cahal Pech
El Pilar
Blue Hole (park)
Guanacaste National Park
Chiquibul National Park
Mountain Pine Ridge Forest Reserve
Barton Creek Cave and Actun Tunichil Muknal (cave)
 Falls
Chaa Creek
Big Rock Falls
Belize Botanic Gardens
Victoria Peak, Belize's 2nd highest point at 1,120 m (3,675 ft)
Doyle's Delight, Belize's highest point at 1,124 m (3,688 ft)
Chalilo Dam
Maya Mountains

Toledo District
Lubaantun
Nim Li Punit
Payne's Creek National Park
Port Honduras Marine Reserve
San Antonio, Santa Cruz and Rio Blanco Falls
Maya Mountains
Blue Creek
Sapodilla Cayes
Southwater Caye

Corozal District
Bacalar Chico National Park
Cerros
The Corozal Free Zone
Louisville, Belize
Sarteneja

See also

 Visa policy of Belize
 Economy of Belize

Notes

References

 
Belize